Toranmal is a Hill Station in the municipal council of the Nandurbar district in the Indian state of Maharashtra. One can reach through Shahada. It is a hill station located in the Satpura Range. Its Gorakhnath Temple is the site of a Yatra attended by  thousands of devotees on Mahashivratri. On that occasion pilgrims walk barefoot for days from surrounding areas in the Nandurbar district but also from Maharashtra, Madhya Pradesh and Gujarat. Toranmal is the prominent hill station of Khandesh region.

Approach 
However, for approach from Mumbai , train station to approach is Dhule (90 km) or Chalisgaon (145 km.). Nearest Airport is Surat.

References

Villages in Nandurbar district
Hill stations in Maharashtra
Waterfalls of Maharashtra
Tourist attractions in Nandurbar district